{{DISPLAYTITLE:C17H25N3O5S}}
The molecular formula C17H25N3O5S (molar mass: 383.46 g/mol, exact mass: 383.1515 u) may refer to:

 Meropenem
 Veralipride

Molecular formulas